A grandfather shirt or grandad shirt is a long-sleeved or short-sleeved flannel or brushed cotton band collared shirt worn throughout Ireland. Traditional shirts are white with coloured vertical stripes. Longer shirts are used as nightshirts or pajamas. The nightshirt version can include a matching nightcap. 

The style of shirt (called a union shirt) was also worn by working-class men in the United Kingdom during the industrial era. At this period, the lack of a turndown or collar "cape" was filled by the use of a detachable collar. The 2010s decade has also seen the garment feature as a mainstream fashion item for men.

The grandfather shirt is also made of Irish linen. The linen version is colloquially known as a 'Sunday shirt'. Sunday shirts are often paired with black trousers or Irish tweed pants and worn to mass, christenings, funerals, and weddings.

In popular culture, a variety of traditional Irish clothing was featured on the BBC series Ballykissangel and the Irish folk band, The Clancy Brothers were often photographed wearing traditional Irish clothes.

A similar collarless shirt or tunic, known as a kurta, is traditionally worn in the Islamic world and South Asia. This usually has three or four buttons, and is often decorated with intricate embroidery.

See also
Henley shirt
Aran jumper
Flat cap
Brogues
National costume

References

Irish clothing
Irish culture
Shirts
Necklines